The term Roman Orient may refer to:

 Diocese of the Orient, an administrative diocese in eastern regions of the Roman Empire
 Prefecture of the Orient, a praetorian prefecture in eastern regions of the Roman Empire
 in general, eastern regions of the Roman Empire

See also
 Orient (disambiguation)
 Roman Africa (disambiguation)
 Roman Europe (disambiguation)